Franklin Robert Shortreed (September 18, 1875 – February 11, 1954) was a Canadian political figure in Saskatchewan. He represented Happyland in the Legislative Assembly of Saskatchewan from 1922 to 1925 as a Liberal.

Early life 
Shortreed was born in Salem, Ontario, and educated in Morden, Manitoba.

Career 
In 1903, Shortreed moved from Manitoba to Tantallon, Saskatchewan, where he served as postmaster and operated a lumber and implement business. He moved with his family to the Maple Creek area, where he settled on a farm, in 1909. Shortreed later served as reeve for the local municipality. He was first elected to the provincial assembly in a 1922 by-election held following the death of Stephen Morrey.

References 

Saskatchewan Liberal Party MLAs
1875 births
1954 deaths

People from Morden, Manitoba
Members of the Legislative Assembly of Saskatchewan